Stichopus vastus is a species of sea cucumber in the family Stichopodidae. It is found on the seabed in the tropical, western Indo-Pacific Ocean.

References

External links
 

Stichopodidae
Animals described in 1887